Cheriyan Kalpakavadi is an Indian story, screenplay and dialogue writer known for his association with director Venu Nagavally and actor Mohanlal. The partnership has produced some Malayalam films in the 1990s.

Filmography

References

External links 
 

Malayalam screenwriters